The 2022 Trans–Tasman Hockey Series was a men's field hockey series, comprising four test matches between the national teams of Australia and New Zealand. The series was held at the National Hockey Centre in Auckland, from 31 May to 5 June.

Due to the ongoing impacts of the COVID-19 pandemic, the series was the first time the New Zealand side competed in an international match since July 2021 at the Olympic Games. The series was scheduled to be held alongside the women's event, however it was postponed due to COVID related issues.

Squads

Head coach: Colin Batch

Head coach:  Gregory Nicol

Results
All times are local (NZST).

Standings

Fixtures

Goalscorers

References

External links
Hockey New Zealand
Hockey Australia

International field hockey competitions hosted by New Zealand
Trans-Tasman Series
Trans-Tasman Series
Trans-Tasman Series
Sport in Auckland
Trans-Tasman Hockey Series
Trans-Tasman Hockey Series